Klaus Balkenhol (born 6 December 1939 in Velen) is a German equestrian and Olympic champion. He won a gold medal in team dressage at the 1992 Summer Olympics in Barcelona with the team from Germany. Balkenhol is the author of several dressage books. He is an avid member of Xenophen, and like Philippe Karl petitions against the use of rollkur. Balkenhol's earlier riding career consisted of being a mounted policeman. He was also the coach of the U.S. Olympic team. He also received a gold medal with the German team in 1996. At present Balkenhol is the trainer of Olympic equestrian Laura Bechtolsheimer.

References

Bibliography

1939 births
Living people
German dressage riders
Olympic equestrians of Germany
German male equestrians
Equestrians at the 1992 Summer Olympics
Equestrians at the 1996 Summer Olympics
Olympic gold medalists for Germany
Olympic bronze medalists for Germany
Olympic medalists in equestrian
Dressage trainers
Medalists at the 1996 Summer Olympics
Medalists at the 1992 Summer Olympics